The PlayStation Link Cable (SCPH-1040) is a peripheral cable for the PlayStation console. Utilizing the serial I/O port found on the back of most PlayStation models, it allows for two consoles to be connected in order to play compatible multiplayer games on separate consoles. It was released during the 1995 Christmas shopping season.

The cable is a 12-pin inline serial cable that plugs directly into the back of the PlayStation console and was a fully supported Sony accessory for the market life of the console. Because it was only designed for original PlayStation models, it's not compatible with the redesigned PS one, nor with succeeding PlayStation consoles such as the PlayStation 2.
 
The main advantage to using the cable was that a split-screen wouldn't be necessary for multiplayer, increasing each player's screen size and potentially increasing game performance (as only one view has to be rendered per console). However, the use of this cable requires two televisions, two PlayStations (with appropriate cables), and two copies of the game being played (with the exception of Armored Core: Master of Arena, Command & Conquer: Red Alert, Command & Conquer: Red Alert: Retaliation and Mobile Suit Z Gundam/NTSC-J which require only one copy as the games come with two discs). This expense was impractical for most consumers, and by the end of 1997 most retailers were no longer carrying the PlayStation Link Cable.

List of games compatible with the PlayStation Link Cable

 Andretti Racing (2 to 4 players)
 Armored Core
 Armored Core: Project Phantasma
 Armored Core: Master of Arena
 Assault Rigs
 Ayrton Senna Kart Duel (EU/JPN)
 Blast Radius
 Bogey Dead 6 (Raging Skies in Europe and Sidewinder in Japan
 Burning Road
 Bushido Blade
 Bushido Blade 2
 Car & Driver Presents: Grand Tour Racing '98 (2 to 4 players) (Total Drivin in Europe)
 CART World Series (2 to 4 players)
 Command & Conquer: Red Alert
 Command & Conquer: Red Alert: Retaliation
 Cool Boarders 2
 Dead in the Water
 Descent
 Descent Maximum
 Destruction Derby
 Dodgem Arena (EU exclusive)
 Doom
 Duke Nukem: Total Meltdown
 Dune 2000
 Explosive Racing (X-Racing in Japan)
 Final Doom
 Formula 1
 Formula 1 98 (2 to 4 players)
 Independence Day
 Krazy Ivan
 Metal Jacket
 Monaco Grand Prix: Racing Simulation (2 to 4 players)
 Monaco Grand Prix: Racing Simulation 2 (2 to 4 players)
 Motor Toon Grand Prix
 Motor Toon Grand Prix 2
 Mobile Suit Z Gundam (NTSC-J)
 Pro Pinball: Big Race USA
 R4: Ridge Racer Type 4 (2 to 4 players)
 Racingroovy (JP exclusive)
 Red Asphalt (Rock N' Roll Racing 2: Red Asphalt in Europe)
 Ridge Racer Revolution
 Robo Pit 2
 Road & Track Presents: The Need for Speed
 Rogue Trip: Vacation 2012
 San Francisco Rush: Extreme Racing
 Shutokou Battle R (JPN exclusive)
 Streak - Hoverboard Racing
 Test Drive 4
 Test Drive Off-Road (NTSC only - removed from PAL version)
 TOCA 2 Touring Cars (2 to 4 players) (Touring Car Challenge in North America)
 Trick'N Snowboarder
 Twisted Metal 3
 Wipeout
 Wipeout 2097 (Wipeout XL in North America)
 Wipeout 3: Special Edition (EU) (2 to 4 players) (Original release requires using default name LINK on both systems to enable establish link option)
 Wing Over

References

PlayStation (console) accessories